RBC Capital Markets is a global investment bank providing services in banking, finance, and capital markets to corporations, institutional investors, asset managers, and governments globally. Locations span 58 offices in 14 countries across North America, the UK, Europe, and the Asia-Pacific region. Employment estimates for RBC professionals are roughly 7,800 per company reports. Services provided include insights required to raise capital, access markets, mitigate risk, and acquire or dispose of assets for clients worldwide.

Overview
RBC Capital Markets is part of Royal Bank of Canada (RBC). Operating since 1869, RBC is the fifth largest in North America and the 11th largest bank globally as measured by market capitalization. With a strong capital base and consistent financial performance, RBC is among a small group of highly rated global banks.

Broker dealers
Depending on the jurisdiction, the division uses different broker dealer subsidiaries of RBC:
 Canada: RBC Dominion Securities
 United States: RBC Capital Markets, LLC
 Europe: RBC Europe Limited (RBCEL)
 Japan: RBC Capital Markets (Japan) Ltd.
 Australia and Asia: Royal Bank of Canada (ARBN 076 940 880)

References

External links
 RBC Capital Markets

Royal Bank of Canada
Financial services companies established in 1864
Banks established in 1864
Stock brokerages and investment banks of Canada